Luthra is a Arora Hindu and Sikh surname.

Notable people bearing the surname include:

Amit Luthra (born 1960), Indian golfer
Arun Luthra Indo-Anglo-American musician (saxophonist, konnakol artist, composer, arranger)
Balvir Singh Luthra, Indian film director and screenwriter
Balvir Singh Luthra, Indian politician and farmer in Rajasthan
Geeta Luthra, Indian lawyer
 Girish Luthra, Indian Navy officer, Flag Officer Commanding-in-Chief, Western Command from 2016 to 2019
 Nishchay Luthra (born 1999), Indian figure skater
 Pran Nath Luthra (1917–2000), Indian civil service officer and writer
 Salony Luthra, Indian actress
 Sargun Kaur Luthra, Indian actress
Sidharth Luthra (born 1966), Indian advocate at the Supreme Court of India
Suresh Luthra (1944–1019), Indian cricketer
Usha Kehar Luthra (born 1932), Indian pathologist and cytologist
Vandana Luthra (born 1959), Indian entrepreneur, founder of VLCC Health Care Ltd

References

Indian surnames
Arora clans
Punjabi-language surnames
Surnames of Indian origin
Hindu surnames
Khatri clans
Khatri surnames